= Nangal Majha =

- Village
- Country: India
- State: Punjab
- District: Kapurthala
- Tehsil: Phagwara

Government
  - Type: Panchayat raj
  - Body: Gram panchayat

Area
  - Total: 258.29 ha (638.2 acres)

Population (2011)
  - Total: 2,053; 1,038/1,015 ♂/♀
  - Scheduled Castes: 975; 476/499 ♂/♀
  - Total Households: 464

Languages
  - Official: Punjabi
- Time zone: UTC+5:30 (IST)
- ISO 3166 code: IN-PB
- Website: kapurthala.gov.in

Nangal Majha is a village in Phagwara in Kapurthala district of Punjab State, India. It is located 7 kilometres (4.3 mi) from sub district headquarter and 30 kilometres (19 mi) from district headquarter. The village is administrated by Sarpanch an elected representative of the village.

== Demography ==
As of 2011, The village has a total number of 464 houses and the population of 2053 of which 1038 are males while 1015 are females. According to the report published by Census India in 2011, out of the total population of the village 975 people are from Schedule Caste and the village does not have any Schedule Tribe population so far.

== See also ==
- List of villages in India
